Buckhurst Hill is a suburban town in the Epping Forest district of Essex, England. It is part of the Greater London Urban Area and adjacent to the northern boundary of the London Borough of Redbridge. The area developed following the opening of a railway line in 1856, originally part of the Eastern Counties Railway and now on the Central line of the London Underground.

History
The first mention of Buckhurst Hill is in 1135, when reference was made to "La Bocherste", becoming in later years "Bucket Hill", originally meaning a hill covered with beech trees. It lay in Epping Forest and consisted of only a few scattered houses along the ancient road from Woodford to Loughton. Before the building of the railways, Buckhurst Hill was on the stagecoach route between London and Cambridge, Norwich, Bury St Edmunds and Dunmow. Originally it was a part of the parish of Chigwell; there was no road connecting the two communities and in order to get to church, parishioners had to ford the River Roding at Woodford. The Parish Church of St John was built in 1838 as a chapel of ease but Buckhurst Hill did not become a separate ecclesiastical parish until 1867. St John's National School was also built in 1838. The lord of the manor gave a site next to the church; the building cost £209, most of which was donated by the church congregation. The opening of Buckhurst Hill station in 1856 saw a rapid expansion in the population of the area; nearly six hundred new houses had been built near the station by 1871, leading to the opening of the Prince's Road school in 1872. Some of the land for this expansion was enclosed from Epping Forest, before this practice was halted by the Epping Forest Act, 1878.

The civil parish of Buckhurst Hill became Buckhurst Hill Urban District in 1894. In 1933, it was merged with the Chigwell and Loughton Urban District to form the Chigwell Urban District. A further merger with Epping Urban District, Waltham Holy Cross Urban District and most of Epping and Ongar Rural District in 1974 brought Buckhurst Hill into Epping Forest District, and in 1996, Buckhurst Hill Parish Council was established as a first tier of local government.

Geography
It is at the western edge of Essex, 10.7 miles (17.2 km) northeast of Charing Cross and bordering the London Borough of Redbridge. Parts of Epping Forest in Buckhurst Hill are intermingled with residential areas.

Transport
Buckhurst Hill is served by two London Underground stations: Buckhurst Hill (in London fare zone 5) and Roding Valley (in London fare zone 4), which are on the Central Line. The line directly links the area to central London, as well as local areas including Woodford, South Woodford, Leytonstone, Epping and Loughton.
Also, from nearby Chingford station, services can be used to reach London Liverpool Street via Walthamstow and Hackney. Bus service 397 can be used to reach Chingford station. Most bus routes serving Buckhurst Hill are London Buses services (despite it being outside the London Buses zone).

Sport

Loughton Rugby Union Football Club has its clubhouse and pitches on Hornbeam Rd at the south of the town. Buckhurst Hill F.C. is on Roding Lane at the east of the town.

Buckhurst Hill Cricket Club plays in the Shepherd Neame Essex League, and fields four Saturday XIs, two Sunday XIs, and teams in a junior section. The club plays at two cricket fields: one off Roding Lane at the east of the town; and one at the edge of Powell's Forest (part of Epping Forest), off High Road at the north of the town.

Education
Primary schools in Buckhurst Hill include Buckhurst Hill Community Primary School,(BHCPS),St John's, a CofE, (Church of England) school and Whitebridge Primary School. Braeside School is an independent school, as well as Daiglen School, two primary and secondary schools.

Notable people

 Sir William Addison (1905–1992) – historian and author, lived at Buckhurst Hill and owned a bookshop in Loughton
 Richard Crossman, Labour politician, grew up in Buckhurst Hill 
 Daniel Mays, actor, grew up in Buckhurst Hill
 Jack Straw, Labour politician, was born in Buckhurst Hill
 Dick Turpin moved to Buckhurst Hill in 1725.

References

External links
 Population figures
 Buckhurst Hill Cricket Club
 

Populated places in Essex
Epping Forest District
Civil parishes in Essex